Heather Webber is an American author of romance and mystery novels. She also writes paranormal mysteries under the pseudonym Heather Blake.

Book series
Webber's Lucy Valentine series is a paranormal mystery and romance series. Lucy Valentine comes from a family of psychic matchmakers and inherits the family business. She teams up with private investigator Sean Donahue to solve mysteries.

In the Nina Quinn Mystery series, the heroine is a landscape artist and amateur sleuth in Ohio.

Written under the pen name Heather Blake, the Wishcraft Mystery series is made up of paranormal cozy mysteries set in the fictional Enchanted Village of Salem, Massachusetts. Wishcrafters are witches who can grant wishes.

A second paranormal series written under the pen name Heather Blake is the Magic Potion Mysteries, cozy mysteries set in Hitching Post, Alabama. The witches here make potions and hexes.

Bibliography

As Heather Webber

Lucy Valentine Series
 Truly, Madly, St. Martin's Press, 2010
 Deeply, Desperately, St. Martin's Press, 2010
 Absolutely, Positively, St. Martin's Press, 2011
 "Definitely, Maybe", St. Martin's Press, 2011 (short story)
 Perfectly Matched, CreateSpace Independent Publishing Platform, 2012

Nina Quinn Mysteries
 A Hoe Lot of Trouble, Avon/HarperCollins, 2004
 Trouble in Spades, Avon/HarperCollins, 2005
 Digging Up Trouble, Avon/HarperCollins, 2006
 Trouble in Bloom, Avon/HarperCollins, 2007
 Weeding Out Trouble, Avon/HarperCollins, 2008
Trouble Under the Tree, 2011
The Root of all Trouble, 2013

Romance Novels
 Surrender, My Love, Avalon Books, 2002
 Secrets of the Heart, Avalon Books, 2003
 Hearts Are Wild, Avalon Books, 2004

Other Novels 

 Midnight at the Blackbird Cafe, Forge Books, 2019
 South of the Buttonwood Tree, Forge Books, 2020
The Lights of Sugarberry Cove, Forge Books, 2021
In the Middle of Hickory Lane, Forge Books, 2022

As Heather Blake

Wishcraft Mysteries
 It Takes a Witch, NAL/Penguin Group, 2012
 A Witch Before Dying, NAL/Penguin Group, 2012
 The Good, the Bad, and the Witchy, NAL/Penguin Group, 2013
 The Goodbye Witch, NAL/Penguin Group, 2014
 Some Like it Witchy, NAL/Penguin Group, 2015
 Gone With the Witch, Penguin Random House, 2016
 The Witch and the Dead, Berkley, 2016

Magic Potion Mysteries
 A Potion to Die For, NAL/Penguin/Obsidian, 2013
 One Potion in the Grave, NAL/Penguin/Obsidian, 2014
 Ghost of a Potion, NAL/Penguin Random House, 2015

References

External links
Heather Webber’s website
 Heather Blake’s website

Year of birth missing (living people)
Living people
21st-century American novelists
American mystery writers
American women novelists
Women mystery writers
21st-century American women writers